This page lists all Roman military units that participated in the Marcomannic Wars. There were thirteen legions, two vexillationes, fifty nine auxiliary units and one naval unit.

References

160s in the Roman Empire
170s in the Roman Empire
Roman military units that participated in the Marcomannic Wars
Roman military units that participated in the Marcomannic Wars